The National Lottery (Funding of Endowments) Act 2003 (c 23) is an Act of the Parliament of the United Kingdom.

Section 1 - Funding of endowments
This section amended sections 22, 25, 25B, 38, 41, 43B and 44 of the National Lottery etc. Act 1993.

Sections 1(5) to (7) were repealed on 1 December 2006 by section 21 of, and Schedule 3 to, the National Lottery Act 2006.

References
Halsbury's Statutes,

External links
The National Lottery (Funding of Endowments) Act 2003, as amended from the National Archives.
The National Lottery (Funding of Endowments) Act 2003, as originally enacted from the National Archives.
Explanatory notes to the National Lottery (Funding of Endowments) Act 2003.

United Kingdom Acts of Parliament 2003